Clonuncaria coronae is a species of moth of the family Tortricidae. It is found in Minas Gerais, Brazil.

The wingspan is about 11 mm. The ground colour of the forewings is brownish cream, with somewhat darker suffusions and strigulations (fine streaks). The hindwings are cream brown.

Etymology
The species name refers to the series of spines of the valve and is derived from Latin corona (meaning a crown).

References

Moths described in 2011
Polyorthini